Väinö Gabriel Kivilinna (13 October 1875, Turku - 18 March 1950; surname until 1906 Borg) was a Finnish secondary school teacher, temperance movement activist and politician. He was a member of the Parliament of Finland, representing the Finnish Party from 1907 to 1909 and the Agrarian League from 1922 to 1924.

References

1875 births
1950 deaths
People from Turku
People from Turku and Pori Province (Grand Duchy of Finland)
Finnish Party politicians
Centre Party (Finland) politicians
Members of the Parliament of Finland (1907–08)
Members of the Parliament of Finland (1908–09)
Members of the Parliament of Finland (1922–24)
University of Helsinki alumni
Finnish temperance activists